Okersa High School is a public higher secondary school in the Katwa II community development block, Bardhaman district, West Bengal, India. It was founded in 1857.

References

 Done

High schools and secondary schools in West Bengal
Schools in Bardhaman
Educational institutions established in 1857
1857 establishments in India